Clarecastle (An Clár or ) is a village just south of Ennis in County Clare, Ireland. From 2008 to 2016 the village saw a significant population increase due to its proximity to Ennis, Shannon, and Limerick.

Name
The town is named after the Clare Castle, which stands on an island in the narrowest navigable part of the River Fergus. The Irish Clár, meaning a wooden board, is often used for a bridge. The name probably originated as Clár adar da choradh, which means "the bridge between two weirs". Another explanation of the name is that the de Clare family gave the castle its name, since they had acquired land in Kilkenny and Thomond that included the castle. In 1590 County Clare was named after the castle, which is in a strategic location.

Clarecastle (Clare Abbey) is a parish in the Roman Catholic Diocese of Killaloe. It is also known as Ballyea/Clarecastle. Clare Abbey and Killone Abbey are linked by a footpath, the Pilgrim's Road.

History
Clarecastle was once home to a port servicing a variety of cargo, used for exports and the delivery of items into the nearby town of Ennis, which could not be reached by navigation of the River Fergus.

The Port of Clare
The Port of Clare consisted of the main quay of Clarecastle and an additional berthing frontage downstream towards the estuary. Clare was a busy port during its time, allowing safe navigation and berthing for vessels close to the town of Ennis. The quay structure is approximately 155 metres in length and was completed in 1845 under the supervision of civil engineer Thomas Rhodes, Principal Engineer to the Shannon Commissioners. 

The quay is no longer used for cargo or large vessels, but is suitable for berthing of small craft and recreational use, with an annual community regatta being held in June. Navigation within the quay area for larger vessels is not available at all states of the tide, with the macro-tidal range resulting in almost dry conditions at low water springs. 

During the historical peak of commercial activity at the port, the complicated approaches to Clarecastle from the estuaries of the Shannon and Fergus, arising from issues such as limited depth for navigation exacerbated by the presence of estuarine intertidal mudflats and rhythmites, necessitated the use of maritime pilots and precluded very large vessels from accessing the quay. The sediment transport mechanisms in the estuary and lower Fergus are also influenced by historical land reclamation works.  Navigation beyond Clarecastle towards Ennis is precluded by the presence of a barrage (dam) north of the quay, which serves to limit tidal influence upstream as part of a flood control strategy.

Sports
The local GAA team is Clarecastle GAA. The club's colours are black and white and they are known as the Magpies.

Notable people
The composer Gerald Barry was born in Clarecastle in 1952.

Gallery

See also
 List of abbeys and priories in County Clare
 List of towns and villages in Ireland

References

External links

 Clarecastle GAA
 Website of the Clarecastle Ballyea Heritage and Wildlife Team, with many historical records

Towns and villages in County Clare
Parishes of the Roman Catholic Diocese of Killaloe